Talk Radio is a 1988 American drama thriller film directed by Oliver Stone and starring Eric Bogosian, Alec Baldwin, Ellen Greene, and Leslie Hope. The film was based on the play of the same name by Bogosian and Tad Savinar. Portions of the film and play were based on the assassination of Denver radio host Alan Berg in 1984 and the book Talked to Death: The Life and Murder of Alan Berg by Stephen Singular. The film was entered into the 39th Berlin International Film Festival, where it won the Silver Bear.

Plot
Barry Champlain, a Jewish radio personality in Dallas, Texas, is a host with a biting sense of humor and a knack for condescending to his audience with his controversial political views.

Champlain's radio show is about to go nationwide.  A former suit salesman with the real name Barry Golden, he achieved his rise to fame through guest shots on the Jeff Fisher radio show using different pseudonyms, eventually using Champlain. Barry begins to steal the show with his acerbic sense of humor and sharp wit, which aggravates Fisher. Barry is subsequently given his own show, which rises to the top of the Arbitron radio ratings. Barry receives calls from people who appreciate him for what he does and how he does it, as well as people who seem to hate him. Attacking everyone from gays to drug addicts to rednecks to African Americans, he has a substantial number of hostile callers, from people who take offense to his attitude to radical right-wingers to hate groups phoning in to harass and intimidate him. He receives threatening fan mail when one caller makes a bomb threat. His rise to fame is accompanied not only by attention from radical far-right elements, but also with the alienation of his wife.

As his show is going through a final audition to go into national syndication, Barry grows increasingly isolated and asks his ex-wife Ellen to come and visit him, saying he needs her input and that she's the only person he trusts. They attempt a return to their relationship. Using a fake name and calling from the radio studio, Ellen talks to Barry on the air—the only place he seems to relate to people openly—in an attempt to reach him, to bring him back from the depression he seems to be suffering from. She begs for him to come back, but Barry refuses, bitterly attacking her as the radio production staff, all friends of Ellen, watch in horror; Ellen walks away. Barry confesses his true intentions, admitting he cares more for personal gain than the societal ills he addresses and refusing to apologize for his hypocrisy. He shouts that the American people scare him because of what has happened to his friends, family, and co-workers. He berates his callers that they have nothing worth saying and that they tolerate his abuse and return for more. He screams at them to go away, seemingly unaware of the apparent fact that he attracts his listeners and most of the ire he receives. Ultimately, he realizes he has made his bed and is as stuck with them as they are with him. Despite Barry's meltdown, his co-workers tell him it's now the highest-rated segment in the show's history, and his boss adds that the show will go national.

While Barry is walking to his car, an apparent fan asks for his autograph. As Barry signs it, the "fan" pulls out a gun and shoots him several times, killing him. As the film ends, callers to Barry's show, his co-workers, and Ellen speak on air about him. They say that Barry was a talented, intelligent and funny man, but none of that mattered; he hated himself, and his death wish was finally granted.

Cast

In addition, a plethora of actors provides the voices of one or more "on-air callers" heard during the film, including Rockets Redglare, who appears briefly at the end of the film as the person who murders Barry. Wincott, Levine, Trebor, and Corduner, each credited above for on-screen characters, also provided voices for callers.

Production
Eric Bogosian wrote the screenplay with help from director Oliver Stone. The script was almost entirely based on Bogosian's Pulitzer Prize-nominated original play with some biographical information about Alan Berg, a talk show host in Denver who was murdered in 1984 by white supremacists. In his research for the film version, Bogosian often watched the on-air production of Tom Leykis' talk show, then originating from Los Angeles station KFI. Bogosian's fictional character shares many speech patterns and mannerisms with Leykis.

Filming took place mainly in Dallas, Texas and Irving, Texas. Unlike the film, the original play takes place entirely during the on-air broadcast, and there are no scenes outside the radio station.

Reception
Talk Radio received mostly positive reviews from critics
On Rotten Tomatoes, the film has a "Certified Fresh" approval rating of 82% based on 50 reviews, with an average rating of 7/10. The consensus summarizes: "The gripping union of a director and star at the peak of their respective powers, Talk Radio offers the viewer a singularly unlikable character and dares you to look away."

See also
 List of American films of 1988

References

Bibliography
 Rossi, Umberto. “Acousmatic Presences: From DJs to Talk-Radio Hosts in American Fiction, Cinema, and Drama”, Mosaic, 42:1, March 2009, pp. 83–98.

External links

 
 
 
 
 
 

1980s American films
1980s English-language films
1988 films
1988 drama films
1988 independent films
1988 thriller films
Alliance Atlantis films
American drama films
American films based on plays
American independent films
American thriller films
Biographical films about radio people
Films à clef
Films about radio people
Films directed by Oliver Stone
Films scored by Stewart Copeland
Films set in Dallas
Films shot in Dallas
Films with screenplays by Oliver Stone
Universal Pictures films